JoAnne L. Flynn is an American microbiologist and immunologist. She is a professor at the University of Pittsburgh School of Medicine where she researches mycobacterium tuberculosis pathogenesis and immunology. She was president of the American Association of Immunologists.

Education 
JoAnne L. Flynn completed a B.S. in biochemistry at University of California, Davis in 1982. She earned a Ph.D. in microbial genetics and pathogenic mechanisms at University of California, Berkeley. Her doctoral advisor was Dennis E. Ohman. Flynn was a postdoctoral fellow from October 1987 to June 1990 at the Scripps Research Institute Graduate Program in the microbial genetics clinic in the department of molecular biology.  Her advisor was Magdalene So.

Career and research 
Flynn was a research associate at the Howard Hughes Medical Institute and the Albert Einstein College of Medicine from June 1990 to December 1993. Her advisor was Barry Bloom. She is a professor in the department of microbiology and molecular genetics at the University of Pittsburgh School of Medicine.

From 2018 to 2019, Flynn was president of the American Association of Immunologists.

Her research interests include mycobacterium tuberculosis pathogenesis and immunology.

See also 

 Timeline of women in science in the United States

References 

Living people
Year of birth missing (living people)
Place of birth missing (living people)
American microbiologists
Women microbiologists
American immunologists
Women immunologists
20th-century American biologists
21st-century American biologists
20th-century American women scientists
21st-century American women scientists
American women biologists
University of California, Davis alumni
University of California, Berkeley alumni
Howard Hughes Medical Investigators
Albert Einstein College of Medicine faculty
University of Pittsburgh faculty
American medical researchers
Women medical researchers
American women academics